The DuPage River is a  tributary of the Des Plaines River in the U.S. state of Illinois.

Course
The river begins as two individual streams. St. Joseph Creek, a tributary of the river's East Branch, runs through the small town of Belmont. The two branches meet at the southern end of Knoch Knolls Park, between Naperville and Bolingbrook. The combined DuPage River continues southward from that point, through Plainfield & Shorewood and then west of Joliet. Farther downstream, at Channahon, a dam on the river was originally constructed to raise the DuPage River water level to feed the Illinois and Michigan Canal. From Channahon, the river finally meets the Des Plaines River.

Flooding
Other flooding was also very common, along Washington Street in Naperville and Illinois Route 53 in Glen Ellyn, because those roads are close to their respective branches of the river, and along the river in Plainfield. The City of Naperville has torn down many of the affected homes and businesses, in the former case, and DuPage County, with U.S. Department of Transportation funding, tore down many of the affected homes in the latter case.

History

The first written history to address the name, the 1882 History of DuPage County, Illinois, relates that:

On the 1825 Henry S. Tanner map of Illinois and Missouri, Du Page River is listed as the "Du Page or Saukeyuck River".

See also
List of rivers of Illinois

References

External links

DuPage River Coalition, from The Conservation Foundation
Flood-inundation Maps for the Dupage River from Plainfield to Shorewood, Illinois United States Geological Survey
West Branch Watershed Map
East Branch Watershed Map

Bodies of water of DuPage County, Illinois
Rivers of Illinois
Rivers of Cook County, Illinois
Rivers of Will County, Illinois
Tributaries of the Illinois River